John Warbrick Pierce (1873–1908) was an English footballer who played in the Football League for Preston North End.

References

1873 births
1908 deaths
English footballers
Association football inside forwards
English Football League players
Preston North End F.C. players
Bristol Rovers F.C. players
Chorley F.C. players